Natalija Piliušina (born 1990) is an eight time NCAA All-American, 2013 1500 NCAA champion, and Lithuania record holder and fastest miler in Baltic history. Natalija was the '14-'15 Oklahoma State University athlete of the year.

References

1990 births
Living people
Oklahoma State University alumni
Track and field athletes from Oklahoma
Lithuanian female middle-distance runners
Lithuanian female long-distance runners
Sportspeople from Klaipėda